Monticello Store and Post Office is a historic general store and post office located at Monticello, Fairfield County, South Carolina, United States. It may have been built as early as 1820, and is a one-story, frame, weatherboarded, T-shaped building. The front façade features an undercut gallery with a pedimented gable supported by octagonal wooden columns. The building was used as a store and post office after the American Civil War until the mid-1960s.

It was added to the National Register of Historic Places in 1984.

References

Commercial buildings on the National Register of Historic Places in South Carolina
Post office buildings on the National Register of Historic Places in South Carolina
Commercial buildings completed in 1820
Buildings and structures in Fairfield County, South Carolina
National Register of Historic Places in Fairfield County, South Carolina